Charlie Emslie (born 30 October 2000) is a Scotland international rugby league footballer who plays as a  forward for the Barrow Raiders in the Betfred Championship.

Background
Emslie was born in Lancaster, Lancashire, England. He is of Scottish heritage. 

He was educated at Furness College.

Playing career

Club career
Emslie joined Barrow Raiders as a youth and was later rewarded with a deal from the 2021 season.

International career
Emslie played for the Scotland students side. He also played for Scotland under 19s.

He made his international debut for Scotland in 2021, scoring two tries against Jamaica.

In 2022 Emslie  was named in the Scotland squad for the 2021 Rugby League World Cup.

References

External links
Barrow Raiders profile
Scotland RL profile
Scotland profile

2000 births
Living people
Barrow Raiders players
English rugby league players
Rugby league players from Lancashire
Rugby league second-rows
Scotland national rugby league team players